Munmun Dutta (born 28 September 1987) is an Indian television actress and model. She is best known for her portrayal of Babita Iyer in the popular Hindi sitcom Taarak Mehta Ka Ooltah Chashmah.

Early life and education 
Dutta was born on 28 September 1987 in Durgapur, West Bengal. She completed a master's degree in English. In Kolkata, she used to perform as a child singer for Akashvani and Doordarshan. While living in Pune, Dutta participated in fashion shows. She came to Mumbai and had her acting debut in Zee TV's 2004 serial Hum Sab Baraati. Her first film role was in Kamal Haasan's Mumbai Xpress. In 2006, she appeared in the film Holiday.

Filmography

Films 
Mumbai Xpress (2005)
Holiday (2006)
Dhinchak Enterprise (2015)
The Little Goddess (2018; Short film)

Television

Awards and nominations

Controversies 
On 9 May 2021, a case was registered, in Hansi, against her due to discriminatory slur (seemingly violating "Scheduled Caste and Scheduled Tribe (Prevention of Atrocities) Act, 1989") made by her on her Youtube video that went viral. The actress, however, apologized for the comment after hashtags demanding her arrest, on social media, after which she stated- "She did not know that language and didn't intend to hurt anyone's sentiments." She was arrested in 2022 and her anticipatory bail was rejected.

In mid-September 2021, Dutta came in public interest due to her relationship with co-star Raj Anadkat. However, after some days both the actors denied all rumours and stated them "fake and false".

See also 
List of Hindi television actresses

References

External links 

 
 
 

1987 births
Living people
Indian film actresses
Indian television actresses
Female models from Mumbai
Actresses in Hindi television
Actresses in Hindi cinema
21st-century Indian actresses
People from Durgapur, West Bengal